Dereköy is a village in the Mudanya district of Bursa Province in Turkey.

References

Villages in Mudanya District